Mesoglossus intermedius is a species of acorn worms in the family Harrimaniidae, which is endemic to Northern California.

References

Animals described in 2010
Endemic fauna of California
Hemichordates